Henrik Eyermann (born 12 June 1961 in Limhamn, Sweden) is a Swedish former Olympic sailor in the Star class. He competed in the 1984 Summer Olympics together with Kent Carlsson, where they finished 4th.

References

1961 births
Living people
Olympic sailors of Sweden
Swedish male sailors (sport)
Star class sailors
Sailors at the 1984 Summer Olympics – Star